Sir Ian Clark Wood,  (born 21 July 1942) is a Scottish billionaire businessman and philanthropist. He is best known for his work in the North Sea oil industry with Wood Group, which he was largely responsible for transforming from a company of modest size, serving a primarily local market, to a large corporation with operations in over 50 countries. He served as Wood Group's chief executive from 1967 to 2006, and as chairman until 2012. Wood is one of Scotland's wealthiest people, with an estimated net worth of around £1.7 billion (2020).

In 2007, Wood and his immediate family set up The Wood Foundation – a venture philanthropy organisation.

Early life
Wood was born in Aberdeen on 21 July 1942 and educated at Robert Gordon's College, and then the University of Aberdeen, where he studied psychology and graduated in 1964.

Career
After leaving university he joined the family business, becoming managing director in 1967. He was appointed Commander of the Order of the British Empire (CBE) in the 1982 New Year Honours and was knighted in the 1994 New Year Honours.

He has been awarded honorary doctorates by the University of Aberdeen in 1984, The Robert Gordon University in Aberdeen in 1998, Glasgow Caledonian University in 2002, and Heriot-Watt University in 2012. Since 2004, he has served as chancellor of the Robert Gordon University.

In April 2010, Aberdeen City Council accepted his conditional investment of up to £85m (£50m confirmed, £35m pledged should the project exceed its budget), towards a project of £140m to redesign the Union Terrace Gardens, The project was supported by some local businesses though opposed by a large number of local residents. The Union Terrace Gardens project was passed by referendum but was later rejected by the council.

In July 2012, Wood announced that he would retire as chairman of Wood Group, with Allister Langlands as his successor.

In 2014, Wood had a net worth of £1.32 billion. Wood is chairman of The Wood Foundation, investing in two areas of activity: making markets work for the poor in sub-Saharan Africa and developing young people in Scotland. The Foundation applies the principles of venture philanthropy, investing both money and expertise to achieve systemic change.

Wood was promoted to Knight Grand Cross of the Order of the British Empire (GBE) in the 2016 Birthday Honours for services to the oil and gas industry. In June 2018 he was appointed a Knight of the Order of the Thistle (KT) in the 2018 Birthday Honours.

According to the Sunday Times Rich List in 2020, Wood is worth an estimated £1.7 billion, a decrease of £54 million on the previous year.

Wood: RGU head who handed honorary degree to Donald Trump

Ian Wood spent 16 years as head of Robert Gordon University, stepping down in 2021.   During his tenure, Donald Trump was controversially awarded an honorary degree personally conferred on him by Sir Ian in 2010. The degree was removed after Dr David Kennedy returned his own degree in protest  and journalist/campaigner Suzanne Kelly's petition was signed by approximately 80,000 people. who felt Trump's behaviour was contrary to RGU's values.

Controversial Wood Group Tax move

In 2011, Wood Group transferred North Sea staff to a company in a tax haven apparently to avoid employer national insurance contributions, a move criticised by Scottish politicians, while union official Jake Molloy described it as “morally and ethically contemptible”. Ian Wood retired from Wood Group the following year.

Personal life
Wood has three sons with his wife Helen, and six grandchildren. They have a second home at Loch Tummel, Perthshire.

Honours and awards

1982 Commander of the Order of the British Empire (CBE) in the 1982 New Year Honours
1984 Honorary Doctor of Laws (LL.D.) degree from the University of Aberdeen
1994 Knight Bachelor in the 1994 New Year Honours
1998 Honorary Doctor of Business Administration (DBA) degree from Robert Gordon University
2002 Honorary Doctor of Technology (D.Tech.) degree from Glasgow Caledonian University
2012 Honorary Doctor of Engineering (D.Eng.) degree from Heriot-Watt University
2016 Knight Grand Cross of the Order of the British Empire (GBE) in the 2016 Birthday Honours
2018 Knight Companion of the Order of the Thistle (KT) in the 2018 Birthday Honours

References

Living people
People from Aberdeen
People educated at Robert Gordon's College
Alumni of the University of Aberdeen
Businesspeople awarded knighthoods
Knights of the Thistle
Knights Grand Cross of the Order of the British Empire
Knights Bachelor
People associated with Robert Gordon University
Scottish chief executives
Scottish knights
1942 births
Scottish billionaires
20th-century Scottish businesspeople
21st-century Scottish businesspeople
Giving Pledgers
21st-century philanthropists